The Connecticut Chiefs are a Junior Tier III ice hockey team from Newington, Connecticut, playing in the Eastern Hockey League (EHL).

Previously known as the Oilers, the organization also had youth teams, ranging from age groups of 6 to 16-years-old, and competed in the Atlantic Youth Hockey League (AYHL) out of the SoNo Icehouse in Norwalk, Connecticut. However, these teams joined the Connecticut RoughRiders organization when the Oilers relocated to Hamden.

History
The franchise was founded as the Capital District Selects playing out of Troy, New York. After several seasons as an independent midget team, the CD Selects joined the Eastern Junior Hockey League (EJHL) in 1998 as a part-time member, joining full-time in 1999. The team was owned and coached by former RPI coach Jim Salfi. Beginning with the 2002–03 season, the Selects played in the Eastern Junior Hockey League's South Division, until the Boston Junior Shamrocks were sold and moved to Philadelphia which moved the Selects to the North Division.

In 2012, the team was sold and relocated to Norwalk, Connecticut, and renamed the Connecticut Oilers and became affiliated with the United States Hockey League's Cedar Rapids RoughRiders. During the summer of 2013, Tier III junior hockey was drastically reorganized in the north eastern United States resulting in the Oilers moving to the Atlantic Junior Hockey League. On June 6, 2013, the AJHL became the Eastern Hockey League.

The Oilers would have their best season in 2014–15 and won the EHL playoffs and league championship. Winning the league championship would normally qualify the team for the 2015 USA Hockey Tier III National Championships, however due to a clerical error with a pair of the Oilers' import player's paperwork, the runner-up Northern Cyclones represented the EHL. Due to these circumstances, the EHL would later void their playoff championship and claim a "vacant" playoff champion for that season.

After the 2016–17 season, the Oilers relocated to Hamden, Connecticut, when the Cedar Rapids RoughRiders established an EHL expansion team in Norwalk called the Connecticut RoughRiders. 

In 2018, the Connecticut Chiefs, a youth hockey organization in Newington, Connecticut, obtained the Oilers' franchise rights and plan to operate the franchise in the EHL during the 2018–19 season.

Due to effects of the COVID-19 pandemic, the junior teams temporarily relocated halfway through the 2020–21 season to West Springfield, Massachusetts, as the Western Mass Chiefs.

Season-by-season records

|}

Notable alumni
Dave Evans - Clarkson University (Carolina Hurricanes 1999 Draft Pick)
Ben Guite - University of Maine (Montreal Canadiens 1997Draft Pick)
Jay Leach - Providence College (NHL player)
David Leggio - Clarkson University (TPS Turku SM-liiga player)
Nick Petrecki - Boston College (San Jose Sharks 2007 1st Round Draft Pick)
Matthias Trattnig - University of Maine (Chicago Blackhawks 1998 Draft Pick)
Curtis Valentine - Bowling Green University (Vancouver Canucks 1998 Draft Pick)
Shawn Weller - Clarkson University (Ottawa Senators 2004 Draft Pick)
Brian Robbins - UMass - Lowell

References

External links
 Connecticut Chiefs Website
 Eastern Hockey league (EHL) Website

Ice hockey teams in New York (state)
Ice hockey teams in Connecticut
Hamden, Connecticut
Sports in Fairfield County, Connecticut
2012 establishments in Connecticut
Norwalk, Connecticut
Ice hockey clubs established in 2012